Ballard State Forest is a state forest of New Hampshire located in Derry, Rockingham County, in the southeast part of the state. It includes the Taylor Mill Historic Site, an old sawmill, and Ballard Pond, which provides water for the mill. The forest is located on Island Pond Road, east of the downtown of Derry. The pond drains via Taylor Brook and Island Pond into the Spicket River, a tributary of the Merrimack River.

The name of the park is due to the former property owner, Ernest Ballard. In 1939, he bought the land. By that time, the original mill was scrapped, and Ballard bought a similar mill, and subsequently spent two years together with his wife restoring the mill and replacing missing parts. In 1953, he donated the mill and the land to the state of New Hampshire.

References

New Hampshire state forests
Parks in Rockingham County, New Hampshire
Derry, New Hampshire